Welland Stadium is a stadium in Welland, Ontario, Canada. It is primarily used for baseball and was the home of the Welland Pirates of the Short-Season A New York–Penn League who affiliated with the Pittsburgh Pirates and the Niagara Stars of the Canadian Baseball League.  The ballpark has a capacity of 2,500 people and was opened in 1989. Famous players who played for the Welland Pirates included Tim Wakefield. As of 2019, Welland Stadium is currently home to the Welland Jackfish of the Intercounty Baseball League.

References

Minor league baseball venues
Buildings and structures in Welland
Baseball venues in Ontario
Sport in Welland